The Serbian Radical Party of Republika Srpska ( or СРС РС/SRS RS) was a Serb centre-right political party in Bosnia and Herzegovina, active in Republika Srpska. It was founded in 1992 by Nikola Poplašen, a former Serbian Democratic Party member. SRS RS has since affiliated itself with the Serbian Progressive Party, a pro-EU offshoot of the Serbian Radical Party established in 2008. In April 2019, most of the SRS's membership joined the Party of Democratic Progress (PDP), and the SRS de facto merged with the PDP.

Parliamentary elections

Positions held
Major positions held by SRS RS members:

External links

Website in Serbian

References

1992 establishments in Bosnia and Herzegovina
Conservative parties in Bosnia and Herzegovina
Nationalist parties in Bosnia and Herzegovina
Political parties established in 1992
Political parties in Republika Srpska
Pro-European political parties in Bosnia and Herzegovina
Serb political parties in Bosnia and Herzegovina
Serbian Radical Party
Serbian Progressive Party